Teen Titans is an American animated television series based on the DC Comics series of the same name by Bob Haney and Bruno Premiani. Developed by Glen Murakami, Sam Register, and David Slack for Cartoon Network and Kids' WB. The series was produced by DC Entertainment and Warner Bros. Animation with Sander Schwartz serving as executive producer and Glen Murakami, Bruce Timm, and Linda M. Steiner signing on as producers. The series follows the adventures of a team of crime-fighting teenaged superheroes, consisting of the leader Robin (voiced by Scott Menville), foreign alien princess Starfire (voiced by Hynden Walch), the technological genius Cyborg (voiced by Khary Payton), the dark sorceress Raven (voiced by Tara Strong), and the green shapeshifter Beast Boy (voiced by Greg Cipes).

Inspired by the success of the DC Comics based series Justice League, the series was created in a semi-serialized format, utilizing anime styles and mixing it with American style animation. The show was greenlit in September 2002 and began airing on Cartoon Network on July 19, 2003, and on Kids' WB on November 1, 2003. The series lasted five seasons, each consisting of 13 episodes, with the 65th and final episode airing on January 16, 2006. The series was concluded with a television movie titled Teen Titans: Trouble in Tokyo on September 15, 2006. Each season has a story arc revolving around a main character: Robin (season one), Terra (season two), Cyborg (season three), Raven (season four), and Beast Boy (season five). The series's alternative network, Kids' WB, aired two seasons of the show. All five seasons of the series were released on DVD, starting with the first season on February 7, 2006 and ending with the fifth season on July 22, 2008. All seasons were also released on Blu-ray Disc, with the first season released on January 23, 2018 and a complete series box-set released on December 3, 2019.

Teen Titans has been critically acclaimed for its strong storylines and for its use of anime influences. The first season garnered strong ratings for Cartoon Network; the network had initially ordered 52 episodes of the series. The series was also nominated for 3 Annie Awards.

Series overview
Each season contains a distinct story arc that is centered on a specific Titan on the team. (A similar setup was later used by WB/DC for The Batman.) Starfire is the only individual member who was part of the original roster to not have a season focused on her, she was instead focused on in the movie.

Episodes

Season 1 (2003)

Season 2 (2004)

Season 3 (2004–05)

Season 4 (2005)

Season 5 (2005–06)

Specials

Special episode (2005)

Television film (2006)

Crossover film (2019)

Home media
From September 28, 2004 to September 20, 2005, Warner Brothers released three volumes (the entire first season and the first six season two episodes) of the series, but cancelled other volumes. From February 7, 2006 to July 22, 2008, currently released complete season releases on two-disc sets. On October 2, 2018, Warner Bros. Home Entertainment released the complete series box set on the seven-disc set, and on Blu-ray on December 3, 2019.

References

External links
 
 Teen Titans at the Big Cartoon DataBase

Teen Titans
Lists of Cartoon Network television series episodes
Teen Titans
List of Teen Titans episodes